Zoran Matković (born 18 October 1961) is a Croatian archer. He competed in the men's individual event at the 1980 Summer Olympics.

References

1961 births
Living people
Croatian male archers
Olympic archers of Yugoslavia
Archers at the 1980 Summer Olympics
Sportspeople from Varaždin